Julius Beer (November 28, 1843 – January 12, 1927) was a member of the Wisconsin State Assembly.

Beer was born in what is now Saxony, Germany. In 1869, he settled on a farm in Hudson, Wisconsin. Later, he expanded the farm into St. Joseph, Wisconsin and become involved in other businesses. Also in 1869, Beer married Ellen Thaka. They had six children.

Political career
Beer was elected to the Assembly in 1904, where he served on the committee for town and county organization. Other positions he held include chairman (similar to mayor) and town clerk of St. Joseph. He was a Republican.

References

People from the Kingdom of Saxony
People from Hudson, Wisconsin
Republican Party members of the Wisconsin State Assembly
Mayors of places in Wisconsin
City and town clerks
Businesspeople from Wisconsin
Farmers from Wisconsin
1843 births
1927 deaths
People from La Crosse County, Wisconsin
German emigrants to the United States